The women's high jump was one of two women's jumping events on the Athletics at the 1964 Summer Olympics program in Tokyo.  Both qualification and the final were held on 15 October 1964.  27 athletes from 18 nations entered, with 1 not starting in the qualification round.

Results

Qualification

Jumpers had to clear 1.70 metres to qualify for the final or be in the top 12 (with all those tying for a place in the top 12 qualifying).  Since only 11 jumpers cleared 1.70 metres, all those clearing 1.68 advanced.  The bar started at 1.55 metres, increasing gradually to 1.70 metres.  Each jumper had three attempts at each height or could skip any lower height (but could not return to a lower height if he determined that he could not succeed).

Final

Each jumper again had three attempts at each height.

References

Athletics at the 1964 Summer Olympics
High jump at the Olympics
1964 in women's athletics
Women's events at the 1964 Summer Olympics